Had Ness is an Israeli settlement organized as a community settlement, in the Golan Heights. Located adjacent to the Jordan River, it falls under the jurisdiction of Golan Regional Council.

The international community considers Israeli settlements in the Golan Heights illegal under international law.

History
Had Ness was established by the revisionist Zionist Herut Beitar settlement movement. Home ownership was approved in March 1982, after the Golan Heights Law was passed in 1981. Families began to move there in 1987. It was named after 3 settlements, Holit, Dekla and Neot Sinai, evacuated from the Sinai Peninsula as a result of the Israel-Egypt Peace Treaty in 1979.

The international community considers Israeli settlements in the Golan Heights illegal under international law, but the Israeli government disputes this, and in March 2019 the United States recognized Israeli sovereignty over the Golan Heights.

See also
Israeli-occupied territories

References

Israeli settlements in the Golan Heights
Populated places in Northern District (Israel)
Golan Regional Council
Populated places established in 1989
Community settlements